Gaojiayuan station is a station on Line 12 and Line 14 of the Beijing Subway. The station is expected to open in 2023.

Location
The station is located in Jiuxianqiao Subdistrict of Chaoyang District. The platform for Line 14 will be located on Wanhong West Street, and the platform for Line 12 will be located at the crossing of Jiuxianqiao Road and Wanhong Road.

Near the station
798 Art Zone

References

Beijing Subway stations in Chaoyang District
Railway stations under construction in China